Madison Heights may refer to communities in the United States:

Madison Heights, Michigan
Madison Heights, Virginia
Madison Heights, Pasadena, California
Madison Heights, a region within Madison, New Jersey